A Lil' Light is a studio album by American rapper Dudley Perkins. It was released via Stones Throw Records on July 15, 2003. The album is entirely produced by Madlib.

Critical reception

Eric K. Arnold of East Bay Express gave the album a favorable review, saying: "Producer Madlib's touch is evident in the album's schizophrenic mix of voices, weird arrangements, and esoteric musical elements, but there's no denying the emotional quotient that's missing from above-ground rap is alive and well here." David Morris of PopMatters said: "Aside from how enjoyable it is in and of itself, A Lil' Light also opens up new possibilities for R&B, brushing off both the pure gloss of the mainstream and the predictable over-emoting of neo-soul in favor of something more bracingly real."

Track listing

Personnel
Credits adapted from liner notes.

 Dudley Perkins – vocals, lyrics, melodies, intro recording, interlude recording
 Madlib – production, intro recording, interlude recording, recording (11)
 David Lona a.k.a. Peanut – background vocals (2)
 Yesterdays New Quintet – guest appearance (10, 16)
 Todd Mumford – recording (1–10, 12–16), mixing (1–10, 12–16)
 Peanut Butter Wolf – mixing (11), executive production
 Dave Cooley – mastering
 Jeff Jank – art direction
 Andrew Gura – cover art

References

External links
 

2003 albums
Stones Throw Records albums
Albums produced by Madlib
Hip hop albums by American artists